Mountain River (山河水) is the third studio album by Chinese artist Dou Wei. The album was released in 1998. It is an experimental album of techno and Chinese traditional music.

Track listing

References

External links 

1998 albums
Dou Wei albums